Sidmouth may refer to:

 Sidmouth, coastal town in Devon, England
 Sidmouth Folk Festival
 Sidmouth Herald
 Sidmouth railway station
 Sidmouth, British Columbia, former railway point in Canada
 Sidmouth, Tasmania, locality in Australia
 Sidmouth Rock (Tasmania)
 Viscount Sidmouth, title in the Peerage of the United Kingdom
 Henry Addington, 1st Viscount Sidmouth (1759-1844)